Mortonagrion hirosei, the four-spot midget, is a species of damselfly in family Coenagrionidae. It is found in Hong Kong and Japan and Taiwan-Wugu wetland. Its natural habitats are rivers and saline marshes. It is threatened by habitat loss.

References
Notes

Sources

Image 

Coenagrionidae
Insects described in 1972
Taxonomy articles created by Polbot